Thomas Mills (1794 – 11 November 1862) was a British Liberal and Whig politician.

Born in Middlesex, Mills was the eldest son of Samuel Mills and Mary née Wilson. He was admitted to Queens' College, Cambridge in Michaelmas in 1815, graduating with a BA in 1819 and an MA in 1822. He was admitted at the Inner Temple in 1816, and called to the Bar in 1832. After this, he was a Justice of the Peace for Middlesex and Bedfordshire and a Deputy Lieutenant of Hampshire.

Mills was first elected Whig MP for Totnes at the 1852 general election and, becoming a Liberal in 1859, held the seat until his death in 1862.

References

External links
 

Whig (British political party) MPs for English constituencies
Liberal Party (UK) MPs for English constituencies
UK MPs 1852–1857
UK MPs 1857–1859
UK MPs 1859–1865
1794 births
1862 deaths
Members of the Parliament of the United Kingdom for Totnes
Deputy Lieutenants of Hampshire
Alumni of Queens' College, Cambridge
English justices of the peace